Martin Veinmann (born on 2 December 1950 in Tallinn) is an Estonian actor.

In 1972 he graduated from the Tallinn State Conservatory's Stage Art Department. Since 1972 he is working at Estonian Drama Theatre.

Besides stage roles he has also participated on several films.

Awards:
 1980: Meritorious artist of the Estonian SSR
 1980: Ants Lauter prize
 2017: Order of the White Star, IV class.

Filmography

 "Šlaager", 1982
 "Karoliine hõbelõng", 1984
 "Nimed marmortahvlil", 2002 (role: commander of the battalion)
 "Kaksikelu", 2003
 "Jaani öö", 2014
 "Kodu keset linna", 2003–2011

References

Living people
1950 births
Estonian male stage actors
Estonian male film actors
Estonian male television actors
20th-century Estonian male actors
21st-century Estonian male actors
Recipients of the Order of the White Star, 4th Class
Estonian Academy of Music and Theatre alumni
Male actors from Tallinn